Below is a list of highways in the United States Virgin Islands (USVI).  US Virgin Islands code places responsibility for highways in the territory to the USVI Department of Public Works.

In the USVI, highways which begin with the numbers 1-2 are located on the island of St. John, 3-4 are located on St. Thomas, and 5-8 are located on St. Croix.

Unlike elsewhere in the U.S., traffic in the USVI drives on the left.

Highways on St. John
Highway 10
Highway 20
Highway 104
Highway 107
Highway 108
Highway 206

Highways on St. Thomas
Highway 30
Highway 32
Highway 33
Highway 35
Highway 37
Highway 38
Highway 39
Highway 40
Highway 42
Highway 301
Highway 302
Highway 303
Highway 304
Highway 305
Highway 306
Highway 308
Highway 313
Highway 314
Highway 315
Highway 318 
Highway 322
Highway 332
Highway 333
Highway 334
Highway 379
Highway 382
Highway 384
Highway 386
Highway 388
Highway 394
Highway 404

Highways on St. Croix
Highway 58
Highway 60
Highway 62
Highway 63
Highway 64
Highway 65
Highway 66
Highway 68
Highway 69
Highway 70
Highway 72
Highway 73
Highway 74
Highway 75
Highway 76
Highway 78
Highway 79
Highway 80
Highway 81
Highway 82
Highway 83
Highway 85
Highway 622
Highway 624
Highway 661
Highway 663
Highway 669
Highway 681
Highway 682
Highway 701
Highway 702
Highway 704
Highway 705
Highway 707
Highway 708
Highway 751
Highway 752
Highway 753
Highway 763
Highway 765
Highway 7010
Highway 7013
Highway 7532

See also

References

 
United States Virgin Islands